Poeciloxestia dorsalis is a species of beetle in the family Cerambycidae.

References

Poeciloxestia
Beetles described in 1860